Rosalind Chao (born September 23, 1957) is an American actress. Chao's best-known roles have been Soon-Lee Klinger in the mid-1980s CBS show AfterMASH, Rose Hsu Jordan in the 1993 movie The Joy Luck Club, the recurring character Keiko O'Brien on Star Trek: The Next Generation and Star Trek: Deep Space Nine in the 1990s, and Dr. Kim on The O.C. in 2003. She also played Hua Li, Mulan’s mother, in the live-action 2020 remake of Mulan.

Early life
Chao was born in Anaheim, California. Chao's parents ran a successful pancake restaurant, Chao’s Chinese and American Restaurant, across the street from Disneyland, and employed her there from an early age. She attended Pomona College in Claremont, California, and later USC, graduating in 1978.

Career
For some time, Chao worked at Disneyland as an international tour guide.

Chao's parents were instrumental in her decision to pursue acting; she began at the age of five in a California-based Peking opera traveling company at the instigation of her parents who were already heavily involved, and during the summers they sent her to Taiwan to further develop her acting skills.

As a child she played the daughter of a laundry owner (played by James Hong) on the 1970 episode of Here's Lucy entitled "Lucy the Laundress".

Deciding not to pursue acting, Chao enrolled in the communications department at the University of Southern California where she earned her degree in journalism. However, after spending a year as a radio newswriting intern at the CBS-owned Hollywood radio station KNX, she soon returned to acting.

Her big break was with the role of Soon-Lee, a South Korean refugee, in the final episodes of the TV series M*A*S*H. Soon-Lee married longtime starring character Maxwell Klinger (Jamie Farr) in the series finale "Goodbye, Farewell and Amen", the most-watched U.S. sitcom television episode of all time as of 2021. Chao continued playing the character in the M*A*S*H sequel: 1983's AfterMASH, her first role billed at co-starring status.

Chao regularly portrayed the Japanese exo-botanist Keiko Ishikawa O'Brien on both Star Trek: The Next Generation and Star Trek: Deep Space Nine  with eight appearances in the former and nineteen in the latter before DS9's end in 1999.  In 2010, a preliminary casting memo for The Next Generation from 1987 was published, revealing that Chao was originally considered for the part of Enterprise security chief Tasha Yar.

In August 2018, Chao was cast as Mulan's mother in the 2020 live-action retelling of Mulan.  In 2019, Chao was invited to join the Academy of Motion Picture Arts and Sciences citing her contributions to critically acclaimed films The Joy Luck Club and I Am Sam.

Personal life
While working in theatre at the Mark Taper Forum, Chao met Simon Templeman; the couple would eventually marry. They have two children, a son and a daughter.

Filmography

Film

Television

Theatre

Games

References

External links

 

1957 births
Living people
American actresses of Chinese descent
20th-century American actresses
21st-century American actresses
Actresses from California
American film actresses
American television actresses
American voice actresses
People from Anaheim, California
Pomona College alumni
Tour guides
USC Annenberg School for Communication and Journalism alumni